Robert Hough is a Canadian author. Hough graduated from Queen's University at Kingston in 1985. Following a career as a free-lance magazine journalist, Hough published his first novel titled The Final Confession of Mabel Stark, in 2001.

Published works

 The Final Confession of Mabel Stark (2001). Toronto: Random House of Canada. . A novel about female-tiger trainer Mabel Stark, it was published in fifteen countries in a dozen languages. It was nominated for the Commonwealth Writer's Prize and The Trillium Award.
 The Stowaway (2004). Toronto: Random House of Canada. . Published internationally, it was listed on The Boston Globe'''s Top Ten Books of the Year and was nominated for the International Dublin Literary Award.
  The Culprits (2007). Toronto: Random House of Canada. . A satire about global warfare, the novel was nominated for the Commonwealth Writer's Prize, Rogers Writers' Trust Fiction Prize and The Trillium Award.
  Dr. Brinkley's Tower (2012) Toronto: House of Anansi. . The story of a charlatan's construction of a million-watt radio tower in a small Mexican community, the novel functions as a satire on imperialism and American intervention. It was nominated for the Governor General's Award, and long-listed for the Giller Prize.
 The Man Who Saved Henry Morgan'' (2015) Toronto: House of Anansi.  An illiterate board game hustler forms an unlikely friendship with the famous privateer, Henry Morgan. It was nominated for the Trillium Award.

References

External links
 Robert Hough's official website
 Random House Canada publishers
 

Living people
Canadian male novelists
21st-century Canadian novelists
21st-century Canadian male writers
Year of birth missing (living people)